Khumbila or Khumbu Yül-Lha, roughly translated as "God of Khumbu" is one of the high Himalayan peaks in the Khumbu region of Eastern Nepal within the boundaries of Sagarmatha National Park.  Considered too sacred to be climbed by most local Sherpa people, the mountain is considered home to the patron God of the local area.  Rising 5,761m above sea level, the mountain overlooks the famous southern approaches to its larger neighbours including Ama Dablam and Mount Everest.

Khumbila has never been climbed; one attempt prior to the 1980s ended when climbers were killed in an avalanche, and there have been no subsequent attempts.

Religious importance

Khumbila is said to be a god, and an old one. The prayers for Khumbila are believed to date back to the time when the ancestors of the Sherpas were still in Tibet (more than 500 years ago). Khumbila is said to have been subdued and converted to Buddhism by Guru Rimpoche, the 8th-century saint who spread Buddhism throughout the Himalaya. In fact, Guru Rimpoche is said to have spent some time meditating in a cave above Khunde, perhaps on the mountain Khumbila itself.

Local buildings often have prayer flags on bamboo wands to honour Khumbila.

References

Khumbila
Five-thousanders of the Himalayas
k